Vaihina Doucet (born 27 July 2001) is a French Polynesian shot-putter who has represented French Polynesia at the Pacific Games and Pacific Mini Games

At the 2019 Pacific Games in Apia she won bronze. At the 2022 Pacific Mini Games in Saipan she won silver.

References

Living people
2001 births
French Polynesian shot putters